Chapacura, or Guapore, was a Chapacuran language.

References

Chapacuran languages